Rondo is a musical refrain form.

Rondo may also refer to:

Arts and entertainment

Music
 Rondò, a two-part operatic vocal form
 Rondo (group), Moscow rock band
 Gene Rondo, stage name of Jamaican reggae singer Winston Lara (1943–1994)
 "Rondo", a song by Cirque du Soleil from Mystere
 "Rondo", a song by 6ix9ine from Day69

Other arts and entertainment
 Rondo (1966 film), a Yugoslavian film
 Rondo (2018 film), an American thriller
 Rondo (series), a fantasy adventure series by Emily Rodda

Places

United States
 Rondo, Arkansas, a town
 Rondo Neighborhood, St. Paul, Minnesota
 Rondo, Missouri, an unincorporated community
 Rondo, Virginia, an unincorporated community

Elsewhere
 Rondo Island, Indonesia
 Rondo Plateau, Tanzania

People
 Rondo (name), a list of people with the surname or given name

Ships
 , a patrol boat in commission from 1917 to 1919
 , a cargo ship in commission from 1918 to 1919
 , a steam cargo ship launched in 1917

Other uses
 Kia Rondo, a nameplate for the Kia Carens compact car
 Rondo Theatre, Bath, England
 Rondo (game), a training drill in association football
 Rondo (grape), a dark-skinned grape variety
 Rondo (soft drink), a citrus-flavored soft drink
 Rondo (confectionery), a candy brand
 Rondo dwarf galago or bushbaby, a primate species of Tanzania
 Rondo blind snake, a snake species
 Rondo Days festival, in Saint Paul, Minnesota, US

See also 
 
 Rondos, Op. 51 (Beethoven), two piano rondos by Beethoven
 Rondo 1, an office building in Warsaw, Poland